Xecutioner's Return is the seventh studio album by American death metal band Obituary, released on August 28, 2007 through Candlelight Records. The title of the album is derived from the band's original band name, which was Xecutioner. The album is their first album since 1990's Cause of Death to be recorded without guitarist Allen West and the first album to feature guitarist Ralph Santolla. Though hailed as a partial return to the more speed-based style of the band's early work, it received positive reviews from critics but mixed reviews from the fanbase.

Track listing

Personnel 
 John Tardy – vocals
 Ralph Santolla – lead guitar
 Trevor Peres – rhythm guitar
 Frank Watkins – bass
 Donald Tardy – drums

References 

Obituary (band) albums
2007 albums